Cory Jermaine Carr (born December 5, 1975) is an American-born Israeli retired basketball player, former NBA and Israeli Basketball Premier League player, and head coach of Israeli women's basketball team Israel Girls Basketball Academy. Carr played for the Chicago Bulls and the Texas Tech Red Raiders.

Biography
After a successful high school basketball career in Kingsland, Arkansas, he went on to play at Texas Tech. In 1995–96 he led the Southwest Conference in three-point field goals, with 92. In 1996–97 he led the Big 12 in points per game (23.1).  In 1997–98 he led the Big 12 in free throw percentage (.861) and points per game (23.3), and was 1997–98 All-Big 12 – 1st Team. During his college career, he scored 1,904 career points and grabbed 411 rebounds. He also made 262 three-point shots.

After being selected in the second round of the NBA Draft in 1998 by the Atlanta Hawks, Carr would play that sole season (the lockout-shortened 1999 season) with the Chicago Bulls, averaging 4 points in 42 appearances.

In 2000, Carr arrived at Israel, beginning a long career in the country. 
He played in Ironi Nahariya, Elitzur Ashkelon, Maccabi Givat Shmuel, Ironi Ashkelon, Hapoel Tel Aviv, Maccabi Haifa B.C.
During that period, he has also played overseas in France, Italy and Cyprus. 

In the beginning of the 2009/2010 season Carr became an Israeli citizen.

In 2016/2017 he was the coach of the youth team of Maccabi Gedera.

Carr is a cousin of NBA player Cliff Levingston.

References

External links

Cory Carr received an Israeli citizenship (Hebrew)

1975 births
Living people
African-American basketball players
American expatriate basketball people in Cyprus
American expatriate basketball people in France
American expatriate basketball people in Israel
American expatriate basketball people in Italy
Atlanta Hawks draft picks
Basketball coaches from Arkansas
Basketball players from Arkansas
Chicago Bulls players
Élan Béarnais players
Hapoel Galil Elyon players
Hapoel Haifa B.C. players
Ironi Ashkelon players
Ironi Nahariya players
Ironi Nes Ziona B.C. players
Israeli men's basketball players
Israeli Basketball Premier League players
Maccabi Givat Shmuel players
Maccabi Haifa B.C. players
Maccabi Ra'anana players
Montecatiniterme Basketball players
New Mexico Slam players
People from Cleveland County, Arkansas
People from Fordyce, Arkansas
Quad City Thunder players
SLUC Nancy Basket players
Texas Tech Red Raiders basketball players
African-American basketball coaches
Israeli basketball coaches
American men's basketball players
Small forwards
Israeli American
21st-century African-American sportspeople
20th-century African-American sportspeople